Gholam Hossein Koohi (born 10 January 1951) is an Iranian former cyclist. He competed at the 1972 Summer Olympics and the 1976 Summer Olympics.

References

External links
 

1951 births
Living people
Iranian male cyclists
Olympic cyclists of Iran
Cyclists at the 1972 Summer Olympics
Cyclists at the 1976 Summer Olympics
Place of birth missing (living people)
Asian Games gold medalists for Iran
Asian Games silver medalists for Iran
Asian Games medalists in cycling
Cyclists at the 1974 Asian Games
Medalists at the 1974 Asian Games
20th-century Iranian people